Roman Stefan Kocen (1932 – 2 April 2013), born in Lodz, Poland, was a neurologist at the Middlesex Hospital and later at the National Hospital for Neurology and Neurosurgery, Queen's Square, London, where his work included the study of neurological complications of tuberculosis. At the age of 18, he received a state scholarship to study medicine at Leeds University and Leeds General Infirmary.

References

British neurologists
British medical writers
1932 births
2013 deaths
Polish neurologists
Warsaw Ghetto inmates
Polish Holocaust survivors
Polish emigrants to the United Kingdom